Charles Davis (31 August 1925 – 12 December 2009) was an Irish character actor, writer and director. He was born in Dublin, Ireland.

Career
Davis started his acting career at the Abbey Theatre in Dublin and had over 1,000 performances on Broadway.

Davis appeared in over 20 movies and over 100 TV shows. Among his movies were The Desert Rats, The King's Thief, The Young Stranger and The Wreck of the Mary Deare. The TV shows he appeared in included Dynasty, Lock-Up, Alfred Hitchcock Presents, The Cara Williams Show, Night Gallery and The Wild Wild West.

Davis was also a writer, director and film producer. He wrote, directed and produced feature films including Kennedy’s Ireland, Thunder Run, Happy as the Grass Was Green (also released under the title Hazel’s People) and The Violent Ones.

Death
Davis died from a heart attack on 12 December 2009, aged 84, in Thousand Oaks, California.

Filmography

References

External links
 

1925 births
2009 deaths
Irish male film actors
Irish male stage actors
Irish male television actors
Irish expatriate male actors in the United States